Endophyton is a genus of filamentous green algae comprising approximately 3 species. Branching is irregular. The medulla has a filamentous construction.

Species 
The  species currently recognised are:E. laurenciae and E. atroviridis.

References

External links

Chaetophoraceae
Chaetophorales genera